Koena is a town in the Oury Department of Balé Province in southern Burkina Faso. The town has a total population of 1,013.

References

Populated places in the Boucle du Mouhoun Region